For the historical département in Algeria, see Oran (department).
Orán is a department of the province of Salta (Argentina).

References 

Departments of Salta Province